Khatu Mal Jeewan  is a Pakistani politician who served as member of the National Assembly of Pakistan and member of the Senate of Pakistan.

Early life and education
He was born on 1 October 1956 in Umerkot, Sindh.

He is a doctor by profession and hold MBBS degree. He graduated from the Dow University of Health Sciences.

Political career
He began his political career after joining the student wing of Pakistan Peoples Party (PPP) in the 1980s.

He was elected to the Provincial Assembly of Sindh in 1988 Pakistani general election as a candidate of PPP on a minority seat.

He was elected to the National Assembly of Pakistan as a candidate of PPP for the first time in 1990 Pakistani general election. He was disappeared during his tenure in 1991 and was forced to quit PPP.

He was elected to the National Assembly for the second time in 1993 Pakistani general election and for the third time in 1997 Pakistani general election. In 1998, he became federal Parliamentary Secretary for Population Welfare.

After PPP formed government following 2008 election, he was made advisor to Chief Minister of Sindh for Mines and Minerals Development Department in 2008.

He was elected to the Senate of Pakistan in 2009 as a candidate of PPP where he continued until his resignation in 2011.

He was re-elected to the National Assembly of Pakistan on a seat reserved for minorities as a candidate of PPP in 2011.

He is the only Hindu Dalit politician in Pakistan who elected as a public representative for seven times.

References

Pakistani MNAs 2008–2013
Living people
Pakistani MNAs 1990–1993
Pakistani MNAs 1993–1996
Pakistani MNAs 1997–1999
Pakistani Hindus
1956 births
Dalit politicians
Thari people